The 33rd Australian Film Institute Awards (generally known as the AFI Awards) were held in October 1991.  Presented by the Australian Film Institute (AFI), the awards celebrated the best in Australian feature film, documentary, short film and television productions of 1991.  Proof received the award for Best Feature Film and five other awards.  Director Fred Schepisi received the Raymond Longford Award for lifetime achievement. The awards were not televised.

Winners and nominees
Winners are listed first and highlighted in boldface.

Feature film

Non-feature film

Television

Additional awards

References

External links
 The Australian Film Institute | Australian Academy of Cinema and Television Arts official website

AACTA Awards ceremonies
AACTA Awards
1991 in Australian cinema